Events from the year 1695 in Denmark

Incumbents
 Monarch – Christian V

Events

Undated events
 Motzmanns Plads, now known as Christiansholm or Papirøen, is created in Vopenhagen.

Births
 11 February – Abraham Pelt, industrialist and philanthropist (died 1783)

Full date missing

Deaths
 27 June – Prince Christian of Denmark, prince of Denmark (born 1675)

References

 
Denmark
Years of the 17th century in Denmark